Alexander Elbert Sie (born 6 September 1987), known as Elbert Sie, is an Indonesian former professional tennis player. After retiring he became a national representative in the sport of soft tennis.

Biography

Sporting career
Born in Bandung, Sie had a best junior world ranking of 63 and appeared in the boys' singles main draw at Wimbledon, before competing professionally at ITF Futures level from 2006 to 2013.

Sie reached a career high singles world ranking on the professional tour of 687 and won three Futures doubles titles.

A regular Indonesian representative in regional multi-sport events, Sie won two gold medals at the 2011 Southeast Asian Games, in the men's doubles and team events. He also claimed two gold medals at the 2013 Islamic Solidarity Games and in 2014 made his Asian Games debut in Incheon.

Sie featured in a total of 18 Davis Cup rubbers for Indonesia between 2006 and 2014, across 12 ties. He registered wins in four singles and three doubles rubbers.

By the time of the 2018 Asian Games he had made the switch to soft tennis and replicated the feat of another Davis Cup player Edi Kusdaryanto by winning a silver medal in the singles event.

Personal life
Sie married Indonesian actress Stevani Nepa in December 2018.

Titles

Doubles: (3)

See also
List of Indonesia Davis Cup team representatives

References

External links
 
 
 

1987 births
Living people
Indonesian male tennis players
Sportspeople from Bandung
Tennis players at the 2014 Asian Games
Soft tennis players at the 2018 Asian Games
Asian Games medalists in soft tennis
Asian Games silver medalists for Indonesia
Asian Games bronze medalists for Indonesia
Islamic Solidarity Games medalists in tennis
Islamic Solidarity Games competitors for Indonesia
Competitors at the 2007 Southeast Asian Games
Competitors at the 2011 Southeast Asian Games
Competitors at the 2019 Southeast Asian Games
Southeast Asian Games medalists in tennis
Southeast Asian Games medalists in soft tennis
Southeast Asian Games gold medalists for Indonesia
Southeast Asian Games silver medalists for Indonesia
Southeast Asian Games bronze medalists for Indonesia
21st-century Indonesian people